ONS 20 and ON 206 were North Atlantic convoys of the ONS/ON series which ran during the battle of the Atlantic in World War II.
They were the subject of a major U-boat attack in October 1943, the third battle in the Kriegsmarines autumn offensive.

Background

Despite the losses suffered by Rossbach and poor results achieved during its attack on SC 143, and
still believing their new weapons and tactics gave them an advantage, BdU (Befehlshaber der Unterseeboote Commander of the Submarines) re-organized the boats then in the North Atlantic into patrol line Schlieffen with the intention of intercepting the expected west-bound convoys. These were ONS 20 and ON 206.

Ships involved

ONS 20 departed Liverpool on 9 October 1943.
Composed of 52 ships it was bound for Halifax, and was escorted by B-4 escort group, which comprised 6 destroyer escorts led by HMS Bentinck (Cdr HR Paramor as Senior Officer Escort).

ON 206 departed Liverpool on 11 October 1943;

Group Schlieffen comprised a number of U-boats from group Rossbach, re-inforced by newcomers from bases in France and Germany. It had already come under attack whilst re-fueling by aircraft from USS Card; one boat was damaged and forced to retire, and 2 boats (U-402 and U-603 ) had been sunk. Another 2 boats had collided, and one of these was also forced to return to base for repair.
At the time of the attack on convoys Schlieffen consisted of 14 boats, with a mix of experience and type.

When Allied intelligence learned of the position of Schlieffen, Western Approaches Command decided to seek battle, increasing the defence by joining the two convoys and their escorts, and sending B-7 as reinforcement.

Action

On 15 October 1943 the convoys were sighted by U-844, and group Schlieffen was direct to converge on the position. By evening a number of boats were in position and commenced the attack, which became one of the most calamitous of the entire campaign for the U-boat Arm (U-Bootwaffe, UBW). During the night of 15/16 October the U-boats attacked but were repulsed; U-844 was damaged by Duncan and Vanquisher and driven off. Later on 16 October U-844 was attacked and sunk by two Liberators from 86 Squadron and 59 Squadron (Royal Air Force); one Liberator was shot down and the crew was rescued by the corvette Pink. U-964 was sunk by a Liberator of 86 Squadron; her survivors were later picked up by U-231. Early that day U-470 was damaged by a Sunderland of 422 Squadron (Royal Canadian Air Force); the Sunderland was also damaged, ditching later near the ships of ONS 20 and its crew was rescued by HMS Drury. Later, U-470 was attacked again by two Liberators from RAF 120 Squadron and another from 59 Squadron and sunk; two of her crew were picked up by Duncan. The only success for the Schlieffen boats that day was when U-426 sank the freighter Essex Lance, which was straggling from ONS 20.

During the night of 16/17 October the attack was renewed but repulsed with no success; U-540 was attacked and damaged by a Liberator of 59 Squadron; later that day she was attacked again and sunk by two Liberators from 59 and 120 squadrons. Also on 17 October U-841 was sunk by Byard of B-4 Group. The convoys made a drastic alteration in course, to shake off any shadowers; this was successful in that BdU received conflicting reports from U-91 and U-413, leading to Schlieffen being sent in the wrong direction. Schlieffen was unable to re-gain contact and in view of the losses sustained BdU ordered the group to retire. On 20 October, with no further attack developing, B-7 Group detached from the convoys to join ON 207, which was following; ONS 20 was handed over to its Western Local Escort Group on 22 October and arrived at Halifax without further loss on 26 October 1943. ON 206 met its Local Escort Group on 24 October and arrived at New York on 27 October 1943.

Conclusion

BdU regarded this operation as a setback but remained confident that their new weapons and tactics would achieve success. The loss of six U-boats for the sinking of one ship was a big defeat for the UbW and is seen as a victory for the Allies.

Tables

Allied ships sunk

Axis submarines destroyed

See also
 List of shipwrecks in October 1943

Notes

References
 
 Peter Gretton : Convoy Escort Commander (1964) ISBN (none)
 Arnold Hague : The Allied Convoy System 1939–1945 (2000) ISBN (Canada) 1 55125 033 0 : ISBN (UK) 1 86176 147 3
 Paul Kemp  : U-Boats Destroyed ( 1997) . 
 Axel Neistle  : German U-Boat Losses during World War II (1998) . 
 Stephen Roskill : The War at Sea 1939–1945 Vol III (1960) ISBN (none)
 Jak P M Showell U-Boat Warfare: The Evolution of the Wolf-Pack (2002)

External links
 ONS 20 on convoyweb
 ON 206 on convoyweb

ONS20
C